The Gannett Central New York Production Facility is a newspaper printing, production and distribution center located in Johnson City, New York, United States.

The facility, which is owned by Gannett, will provide production services for the company's three newspapers in Central New York: The Ithaca Journal, the Binghamton Press & Sun Bulletin and the Elmira Star-Gazette.

The Ithaca Journal was the first newspaper to be fully produced at the facility, beginning June 12, 2006.

The building's press was manufactured by Koenig & Bauer and features eight print towers and 10 reel stands. The press is 150 feet long and 57 feet tall, the equivalent of a six-story building. The press allows for full color on every page of each of the publications printed on it and can print 75,000 newspapers an hour.

The Gannett Central New York Production Facility is located just off Route 17 on the site of a former factory. Construction on the building began in 2004 and the press was installed starting in September 2005.

Total cost of the facility and press was $50 million.

In March 2018, Gannett announced that the facility would be closing, and the printing of the three newspapers would move to the same plant that produces the Gannett-owned Rochester Democrat and Chronicle.

References

External links
Gannett Co. Inc.
The Ithaca Journal
Press & Sun Bulletin
Star-Gazette
Koenig & Bauer
Gannett to move printing of 3 Upstate NY dailies to Rochester, lay off nearly 100

Newspapers published in New York (state)
Binghamton, New York
Gannett
Newspaper companies of the United States
Buildings and structures in Broome County, New York
Central New York